The Midlands/Wales/West Division of the 2008 Twenty20 Cup determined which counties would qualify for the knockout stage of the 2008 Twenty20 Cup. Warwickshire and Northamptonshire qualified automatically, while Glamorgan qualified as the second-best of the third-placed finishers.

Table

Matches

11 June

June 12

June 13

June 14

June 15

Glamorgan Dragons v Worcestershire Royals 
The match at SWALEC Stadium was abandoned without a ball being bowled. One point was awarded to both teams.

June 17

June 18

Glamorgan Dragons v Gloucestershire Gladiators 
The match at SWALEC Stadium was abandoned without a ball being bowled. One point was awarded to both teams.

June 19

June 20

Somerset Sabres v Gloucestershire Gladiators 
The match at the County Ground was abandoned without a ball being bowled. One point was awarded to both teams.

June 22

June 24

June 25

June 26

June 27

Gloucestershire Gladiators v Somerset Sabres 
The match at Nevil Road was abandoned without a ball being bowled. One point was awarded to both teams.

References

Midlands wales west Division, 2008 Twenty20 Cup